

Yellabinna is a locality in the Australian state of South Australia located to the north of the town of Ceduna in the western part of the state.

The locality was established on 26 April 2013 in respect to “the long established local name.”  Its name is derived from the use of “Yellabinna” in the names of the Yellabinna Regional Reserve and the Yellabinna Wilderness Protection Area.

Yellabinna is located within the federal Division of Grey, the state electoral districts of Flinders and Giles, and the Pastoral Unincorporated Area of South Australia.

The land use within Yellabinna is mainly concerned with the following protected areas - the Boondina Conservation Park, the Yellabinna Regional Reserve and the Yellabinna Wilderness Protection Area, although the extraction of heavy mineral sands is underway as of 2013 by Iluka Resources at the Jacinth-Ambrosia Mine in the west of the locality.

Surrounding localities
Yellabinna which is bounded in part to the north by the Trans-Australian Railway is surrounded by the following localities gazetted under the South Australian Geographical Names Act 1991:  
 North:      Commonwealth Hill, Mulgathing
 Northeast:  Wilgena
 East:  Wilgena, Lake Everard
 Southeast:  Kondoolka
 South: Yalata, Chundaria, Mitchidy Moola, Bookabie, Nanbona, Penong, Yumbara and Pureba
 Southwest: Yalata
 West: Nullarbor
 Northwest: Maralinga Tjarutja

See also
List of cities and towns in South Australia
Mount Finke
Jacinth Ambrosia Airport

References

Towns in South Australia
Places in the unincorporated areas of South Australia